Steier is a surname. Notable people with the surname include:

 Andreas Steier (born 1972), German engineer and politician
 Lisa Steier (1888–1928), Swedish ballerina and ballet master
 Lydia Steier (born 1978), American opera director
 Rick Steier (born 1960), American guitarist

See also
Sztajer, a transliteration into Polish